Shavnabada is a mountain and extinct volcano of 2929 m/9507 ft height in southeastern Georgia. It is one of the highest mountains of the Abul-Samsari Range, a part of the Lesser Caucasus.

References 
L. Maruashvili, Georgian Soviet Encyclopedia, V. 10, p. 675, Tbilisi, 1986.

Volcanoes of Georgia (country)
Mountains of Samtskhe-Javakheti region
Extinct volcanoes
Stratovolcanoes